Tulameen, originally known as Otter Flat, is a small community in British Columbia, Canada, about 26 kilometres northwest of the town of Princeton on the Crowsnest Highway (Hwy 3), and about 185 kilometres northeast from the city of Vancouver, British Columbia. Located at the south end of Otter Lake and just north of the Tulameen River, it is on the lee side of the Canadian Cascades mountain range and enjoys a slightly semi-arid climate, sheltered from the heavy rains west of that range.

Early history
The locality was known in fur trade times as Campement des Femmes (Woman's Camp, known as Tseistn in the native language) which was located in present day Tulameen, was native encampment of women while the men went hunting. In the decades of exploration of the remote areas of the province following the creation of the Colony of British Columbia in 1858 and the flurry of exploration of back-country engendered by the nearby Fraser Canyon Gold Rush, prospecting activity led to the discovery of gold in 1885 near the confluence of Granite Creek with the Tulameen River, near present-day Coalmont, about 8 km south of Tulameen and about 18 km northwest of Princeton, which lies at the confluence of the Tulameen and the Similkameen River.

Around the site of the find, the boomtown of Granite Creek (also known by the misnomer Granite City) sprang from nowhere to celebrated status overnight, and was touted (as with so many other BC boomtowns) to become the next great city of the new province - and claiming for itself the status of third-largest town in the province .

Some miners from this rush congregated by the amenable shores of Otter Lake, with the town that sprang up having the name Otter Flats or Otter Lake, which had a number of stores, two hotels, a saloon and post office.

The railway era
The name Otter Flats endured until 1901 when the name Tulameen was officially adopted  as the town acquired some stability due to its being on the routing of the southern mainline of the Canadian Pacific Railway, constructed in 1896 after a potential routing of the US-based Great Northern Railway to the Tulameen.

The southern mainline is commonly known today as the Kettle Valley Railway (KVR), and connected the original mainline at Hope with the Okanagan and Kootenay cities and boomtowns farther east; today much of its route has been converted from railbed to a public hiking and biking as part of the Trans-Canada Trail. During this period, a proper townsite with a street grid was laid out and the lure of the lake, mountain scenery and dry climate of the area encouraged the first recreational residents, as Tulameen enjoyed something of an advantage of being the first drybelt town after the rail journey had overcome the steep grades and tunnels of the Coquihalla Canyon and Coquihalla Pass; coal seams in the area also were useful to rail company operations and the town was a regular stopping-place for taking on coal and water during the Age of Steam.

Although early tourism never really transformed Tulameen into the fashionable watering-hole it might have been, the town enjoyed another small boom with the discovery of a major coal deposit in the area, with a mine nearby Blakeburn opening in the 1920s, but lasting only about 1940.

Tulameen today

There are approximately 300 permanent full-time and 150 part-time residents. This number grows in the summer months. The community also has quad rentals, a community centre, an outdoor skating rink, a library, a volunteer fire department, a skidoo dealer and repair centre, and a general store.

Tulameen is located in Electoral Area 'H' of the regional district of Okanagan-Similkameen (RDOS).

Otter Lake

This very popular 6 km long lake covers approximately 290 hectares (716 acres) at an elevation of 823 m (2700 ft.) It is a great recreational lake for swimming, water-skiing and fishing for lake trout, rainbow trout, brook trout and kokanee. The town of Tulameen is located at the south end of the lake and the provincial campsite borders the north-west side. A scenic bike ride will take you along the Trans Canada Trail, and stopping for ice-cream in Tulameen.

"The Trading Post"

The Tulameen General Store has a restaurant, a liquor store, a post office, and a gas station.

"The Otter Sleep Inn"

There is a motel with six rooms available, mostly vacant throughout the year, that books solid for the summer months.
The motel has propane for sale, a public telephone, public pay showers and a small laundry facility.

Summer events

"Tulameen Daze" August Long Weekend.

A parade takes place on Saturday at noon on the August long weekend. There are many activities and crafts for children and the younger people of the community; there's a beer garden for the adults, with a horseshoe tournament.
The community puts on a baron of beef/cob of corn lunch at the town community hall. There are many sights, contests, duck races, raffles and booths to check out on the main street, in town. There's a pancake breakfast and town clean-up on Monday.
All funds raised from the Tulameen Daze events supports the community of Tulameen and the Tulameen Fire Department.

Miscellaneous note
The name "Tulameen" is praised in the poem "Say the Names" by Canadian poet Al Purdy.

References

BCGNIS listing "Tulameen (community)"
 maintained by the Tulameen Ratepayers Association

Unincorporated settlements in British Columbia
Ghost towns in British Columbia
Populated places in the Similkameen